Major-General William Craig Emilius Napier (18 March 1818 – 23 September 1903) was a British Army officer who became Governor of the Royal Military College, Sandhurst.

Military career
Born the son of Lieutenant-General Sir George Thomas Napier and educated at Cheltenham College, William Napier served with the Buffs (Royal East Kent Regiment), and subsequently with the King's Own Scottish Borderers. He was Director-General of Military Education and fought at the recapture of Port Natal in 1842, in the Scinde Campaign in 1845 and in the Crimean War in 1855.

He went on to be Commandant of the Staff College, Sandhurst in 1861 and Governor of the Royal Military College, Sandhurst from 1875.

He was given the colonelcy of the Buffs (Royal East Kent Regiment) from 1874 to 1882 and of the King's Own Scottish Borderers from 1882 to his death.

Family
He died in 1903. In 1845 he had married his cousin, Emily Cephalonia Napier, daughter of Lieutenant-General Sir Charles James Napier; they had seven daughters and one son.

References

Further reading
 

 

|-

|-
 

1818 births
1903 deaths
British Army major generals
Governors of the Royal Military College, Sandhurst
People educated at Cheltenham College
Buffs (Royal East Kent Regiment) officers
King's Own Scottish Borderers officers
British Army personnel of the Crimean War
Commandants of the Staff College, Camberley